Ganong's Review of Medical Physiology is a textbook in Physiology originally written by William Francis Ganong. The first edition was published in 1963, and the latest, 26th, edition was published in 2019, more than fifty years later than the first. The current edition consists of seven sections and written by Kim E. Barrett, Susan M. Barman, Heddwen L. Brooks and Jason X.-J. Yuan.

References

Biology textbooks
Medical textbooks